Yueyang North railway station is a freight handling station in Yueyanglou District, Yueyang, Hunan, China. It is situated on the Beijing–Guangzhou railway.

In 2019, a connecting line was opened between the station and the new Haoji Railway.

On 23 December 2021, a project started to expand the station. This was completed on 15 September 2022.

References 

Railway stations in Hunan